Eurydice Peninsula is the predominantly ice-covered 8 km wide peninsula projecting from Danco Coast, Antarctic Peninsula 7.4 km northwestwards into Charlotte Bay south of Recess Cove.  It ends in Sepúlveda Point to the north and Meusnier Point to the west.

The feature is named after Eurydice, the mythical wife of the Thracian singer Orpheus.

Location
British mapping in 1978.

Maps
 British Antarctic Territory.  Scale 1:200000 topographic map.  DOS 610 Series, Sheet W 64 60.  Directorate of Overseas Surveys, UK, 1978.
 Antarctic Digital Database (ADD). Scale 1:250000 topographic map of Antarctica. Scientific Committee on Antarctic Research (SCAR), 1993–2016.

References
 Eurydice Peninsula. SCAR Composite Antarctic Gazetteer.
 Bulgarian Antarctic Gazetteer. Antarctic Place-names Commission. (details in Bulgarian, basic data in English)

External links
 Eurydice Peninsula. Copernix satellite image

Bulgaria and the Antarctic
Peninsulas of Graham Land
Danco Coast